In ancient Greek mythology and religion, Persephone, also called Kore or Cora, is the daughter of Zeus and Demeter. She became the queen of the underworld after her abduction by and marriage to her uncle Hades, the king of the underworld.

The myth of her abduction, her sojourn in the underworld, and her temporary return to the surface represents her functions as the embodiment of spring and the personification of vegetation, especially grain crops, which disappear into the earth when sown, sprout from the earth in spring, and are harvested when fully grown. In Classical Greek art, Persephone is invariably portrayed robed, often carrying a sheaf of grain. She may appear as a mystical divinity with a sceptre and a little box, but she was mostly represented in the process of being carried off by Hades.

Persephone as a vegetation goddess and her mother Demeter were the central figures of the Eleusinian Mysteries, which promised the initiated a happy afterlife. The origins of her cult are uncertain, but it was based on ancient agrarian cults of agricultural communities. In Athens, the mysteries celebrated in the month of Anthesterion were dedicated to her. The city of Epizephyrian Locris, in modern Calabria (southern Italy), was famous for its cult of Persephone, where she is a goddess of marriage and childbirth in this region.

Her name has numerous historical variants. These include Persephassa and Persephatta. In Latin, her name is rendered Proserpina. She was identified by the Romans as the Italic goddess Libera, who was conflated with Proserpina. Myths similar to Persephone's descent and return to earth also appear in the cults of male gods including Attis, Adonis, and Osiris, and in Minoan Crete.

Name

In a Linear B Mycenaean Greek inscription on a tablet found at Pylos dated 1400–1200 BC, John Chadwick reconstructed the name of a goddess, *Preswa who could be identified with Perse, daughter of Oceanus and found speculative the further identification with the first element of Persephone. Persephonē is her name in the Ionic Greek of epic literature. The Homeric form of her name is Persephoneia (Περσεφονεία, Persephoneia). In other dialects, she was known under variant names: Persephassa, Persephatta, or simply Korē ("girl, maiden"). On 5th century Attic vases one often encounters the form Plato calls her Pherepapha in his Cratylus, "because she is wise and touches that which is in motion". There are also the forms Periphona (Πηριφόνα) and Phersephassa. The existence of so many different forms shows how difficult it was for the Greeks to pronounce the word in their own language and suggests that the name may have a Pre-Greek origin.

The etymology of the word 'Persephone' is obscure. According to a recent hypothesis advanced by Rudolf Wachter, the first element in the name (Perso- (Περσο-) may well reflect a very rare term, attested in the Rig Veda (Sanskrit parṣa-), and the Avesta, meaning 'sheaf of corn'/'ear (of grain)'. The second constituent, phatta, preserved in the form Persephatta, would in this view reflect Proto-Indo European , from the root  "to strike/beat/kill". The combined sense would therefore be "she who beats the ears of corn", i.e., a "thresher of grain".

Titles and functions
The epithets of Persephone reveal her double function as chthonic and vegetation goddess. The surnames given to her by the poets refer to her role as queen of the lower world and the dead and to the power that shoots forth and withdraws into the earth. Her common name as a vegetation goddess is Kore, and in Arcadia she was worshipped under the title Despoina, "the mistress", a very old chthonic divinity. Günther Zuntz considers "Persephone" and "Kore" as distinct deities and writes that "no farmer prayed for corn to Persephone; no mourner thought of the dead as being with Kore." Ancient Greek writers were however not as consistent as Zuntz claims.

Goddess of spring and nature
Plutarch writes that Persephone was identified with the spring season, and Cicero calls her the seed of the fruits of the fields. In the Eleusinian Mysteries, her return from the underworld each spring is a symbol of immortality, and she was frequently represented on sarcophagi.

In the religions of the Orphics and the Platonists, Kore is described as the all-pervading goddess of nature who both produces and destroys everything, and she is therefore mentioned along with or identified as other such divinities including Isis, Rhea, Ge, Hestia, Pandora, Artemis, and Hecate. In Orphic tradition, Persephone is said to be the daughter of Zeus and his mother Rhea, rather than of Demeter. The Orphic Persephone is said to have become by Zeus the mother of Dionysus, Iacchus, Zagreus, and the little-attested Melinoë.

Queen of the underworld

In mythology and literature she is often called dread(ed) Persephone, and queen of the underworld, within which tradition it was forbidden to speak her name. This tradition comes from her conflation with the very old chthonic divinity Despoina ("[the] mistress"), whose real name could not be revealed to anyone except those initiated into her mysteries. As goddess of death, she was also called a daughter of Zeus and Styx, the river that formed the boundary between Earth and the underworld. In Homer's epics, she appears always together with Hades and the underworld, apparently sharing with Hades control over the dead. In Homer's Odyssey, Odysseus encounters the "dread Persephone" in Tartarus when he visits his dead mother. Odysseus sacrifices a ram to the chthonic goddess Persephone and the ghosts of the dead who drink the blood of the sacrificed animal. In the reformulation of Greek mythology expressed in the Orphic Hymns, Dionysus and Melinoë are separately called children of Zeus and Persephone. Groves sacred to her stood at the western extremity of the earth on the frontiers of the lower world, which itself was called "house of Persephone".

Her central myth served as the context for the secret rites of regeneration at Eleusis, which promised immortality to initiates.

Nestis
In a Classical period text ascribed to Empedocles,  describing a correspondence among four deities and the classical elements, the name Nestis for water apparently refers to Persephone:
 "Now hear the fourfold roots of everything: Enlivening Hera, Hades, shining Zeus, and Nestis, moistening mortal springs with tears."

Of the four deities of Empedocles' elements, it is the name of Persephone alone that is taboo – Nestis is a euphemistic cult title – for she was also the terrible Queen of the Dead, whose name was not safe to speak aloud, who was euphemistically named simply as Kore or "the Maiden", a vestige of her archaic role as the deity ruling the underworld. Nestis means "the Fasting One" in ancient Greek.

Epithets
As a goddess of the underworld, Persephone was given euphemistically friendly names. However, it is possible that some of them were the names of original goddesses:
 Despoina (dems-potnia) "the mistress" (literally "the mistress of the house") in Arcadia.
 Hagne, "pure", originally a goddess of the springs in Messenia.
 Melindia or Melinoia (meli, "honey"), as the consort of Hades, in Hermione. (Compare Hecate, Melinoë)
 Malivina
 Melitodes
 Aristi cthonia, "the best chthonic".
 Praxidike, the Orphic Hymn to Persephone identifies Praxidike as an epithet of Persephone: "Praxidike, subterranean queen. The Eumenides' source [mother], fair-haired, whose frame proceeds from Zeus' ineffable and secret seeds."

As a vegetation goddess, she was called:
 Kore, "the maiden".
 Kore Soteira, "the savior maiden", in Megalopolis.
 Neotera, "the younger", in Eleusis.
 Kore of Demeter Hagne in the Homeric hymn.
 Kore memagmeni, "the mixed daughter" (bread).

Demeter and her daughter Persephone were usually called:
 The goddesses, often distinguished as "the older" and "the younger" in Eleusis.
 Demeters, in Rhodes and Sparta
 The thesmophoroi, "the legislators" in the Thesmophoria.
 The Great Goddesses, in Arcadia.
 The mistresses in Arcadia.
 Karpophoroi, "the bringers of fruit", in Tegea of Arcadia.

Mythology

Abduction myth

Persephone's abduction by Hades is mentioned briefly in Hesiod's Theogony, and is told in considerable detail in the Homeric Hymn to Demeter. Zeus, it is said, permitted Hades, who was in love with the beautiful Persephone, to abduct her as her mother Demeter was not likely to allow her daughter to go down to Hades. Persephone was gathering flowers with the Oceanids along with Artemis and Pallas, daughter of Triton, as the Homeric Hymn says, in a field when Hades came to abduct her, bursting through a cleft in the earth. Demeter, when she found her daughter had disappeared, searched for her all over the earth with Hecate's torches. In most versions, she forbids the earth to produce, or she neglects the earth and, in the depth of her despair, she causes nothing to grow. Helios, the Sun, who sees everything, eventually told Demeter what had happened and at length she discovered where her daughter had been taken. Zeus, pressed by the cries of the hungry people and by the other deities who also heard their anguish, forced Hades to return Persephone.

Hades complies with the request, but first he tricks Persephone, giving her some pomegranate seeds to eat. Hermes is sent to retrieve her but, because she had tasted the food of the underworld, she was obliged to spend a third of each year (the winter months) there, and the remaining part of the year with the gods above. With the later writers Ovid and Hyginus, Persephone's time in the underworld becomes half the year. It was explained to Demeter, her mother, that she would be released, so long as she did not taste the food of the underworld, as that was an Ancient Greek example of a taboo.

Various local traditions place Persephone's abduction in different locations. The Sicilians, among whom her worship was probably introduced by the Corinthian and Megarian colonists, believed that Hades found her in the meadows near Enna, and that a well arose on the spot where he descended with her into the lower world. The Cretans thought that their own island had been the scene of the abduction, and the Eleusinians mentioned the Nysian plain in Boeotia, and said that Persephone had descended with Hades into the lower world at the entrance of the western Oceanus. Later accounts place the abduction in Attica, near Athens, or near Eleusis. The Homeric hymn mentions the Nysion (or Mysion) which was probably a mythical place. The location of this mythical place may simply be a convention to show that a magically distant chthonic land of myth was intended in the remote past.

Before Persephone was abducted by Hades, the shepherd Eumolpus and the swineherd Eubuleus saw a girl in a black chariot driven by an invisible driver being carried off into the earth which had violently opened up. Eubuleus was feeding his pigs at the opening to the underworld, and his swine were swallowed by the earth along with her. This aspect of the myth is an etiology for the relation of pigs with the ancient rites in Thesmophoria, and in Eleusis.

In the hymn, Persephone eventually returns from the underworld and is reunited with her mother near Eleusis. The Eleusinians built a temple near the spring of Callichorus, and Demeter establishes her mysteries there.

In some versions, Ascalaphus informed the other deities that Persephone had eaten the pomegranate seeds. As punishment for informing Hades, he was pinned under a heavy rock in the underworld by either Persephone or Demeter. When Demeter and her daughter were reunited, the Earth flourished with vegetation and color, but for some months each year, when Persephone returned to the underworld, the earth once again became a barren realm. This is an origin story to explain the seasons.

In an earlier version, Hecate rescued Persephone.

The 10th-century Byzantine encyclopedia Suda introduces a goddess of a blessed afterlife assured to Orphic mystery initiates. This Macaria is asserted to be the daughter of Hades, but no mother is mentioned.

Interpretation of the myth

The abduction of Persephone is an etiological myth providing an explanation for the changing of the seasons. Since Persephone had consumed pomegranate seeds in the underworld, she was forced to spend four months, or in other versions six months for six seeds, with Hades. When Persephone would return to the underworld, Demeter's despair at losing her daughter would cause the vegetation and flora of the world to wither, signifying the Autumn and Winter seasons. When Persephone's time is over and she would be reunited with her mother, Demeter's joyousness would cause the vegetation of the earth to bloom and blossom which signifies the Spring and Summer seasons. This also explains why Persephone is associated with Spring: her re-emergence from the underworld signifies the onset of Spring. Therefore, not only does Persephone and Demeter's annual reunion symbolize the changing seasons and the beginning of a new cycle of growth for the crops, it also symbolizes death and the regeneration of life.

In another interpretation of the myth, the abduction of Persephone by Hades, in the form of Ploutus (wealth), represents the wealth of the grain contained and stored in underground silos or ceramic jars (pithoi) during the Summer seasons (as that was drought season in Greece). In this telling, Persephone as grain-maiden symbolizes the grain within the pithoi that is trapped underground within the realm of Hades. In the beginning of the autumn, when the grain of the old crop is laid on the fields, she ascends and is reunited with her mother Demeter. This interpretation of Persephone's abduction myth symbolizes the cycle of life and death as Persephone both dies as she (the grain) is buried in the pithoi (as similar pithoi were used in ancient times for funerary practices) and is reborn with the exhumation and spreading of the grain.

Lincoln argues that the myth is a description of the loss of Persephone's virginity, where her epithet koure signifies "a girl of initiatory age", and where Hades is the male oppressor forcing himself onto a young girl for the first time.

Variations 

According to the Greek tradition a hunt-goddess preceded the harvest goddess. In Arcadia, Demeter and Persephone were often called Despoinai (Δέσποιναι, "the mistresses"). They are the two Great Goddesses of the Arcadian cults, and evidently they come from a more primitive religion. The Greek god Poseidon probably substituted for the companion (Paredros, Πάρεδρος) of the Minoan Great goddess
in the Arcadian mysteries. In the Arcadian mythos, while Demeter was looking for the kidnapped Persephone, she caught the eye of her younger brother Poseidon. Demeter turned into a mare to escape him, but then Poseidon turned into a stallion to pursue her. He caught her and raped her. Afterwards, Demeter gave birth to the talking horse Arion and the goddess Despoina ("the mistress"), a goddess of the Arcadian mysteries.

In the Orphic "Rhapsodic Theogony" (first century BC/AD), Persephone is described as the daughter of Zeus and Rhea. Zeus was filled with desire for his mother, Rhea, intending to marry her. He pursued the unwilling Rhea, only for her to change into a serpent. Zeus also turned himself into a serpent and raped Rhea, which resulted in the birth of Persephone. Afterwards, Rhea became Demeter. Persephone was born so deformed that Rhea ran away from her frightened, and did not breastfeed Persephone. Zeus then mates with Persephone, who gives birth to Dionysus. She later stays in her mother's house, guarded by the Curetes. Rhea-Demeter prophecies that Persephone will marry Apollo. This prophecy does not come true, however, as while weaving a dress, Persephone is abducted by Hades to be his bride. She becomes the mother of the Erinyes by Hades. In Nonnus's Dionysiaca, the gods of Olympus were bewitched by Persephone's beauty and desired her. Hermes, Apollo, Ares, and Hephaestus each presented Persephone with a gift to woo her. Demeter, worried that Persephone might end up marrying Hephaestus, consults the astrological god Astraeus. Astraeus warns her that Persephone will be ravished and impregnated by a serpent. Demeter then hides Persephone in a cave; but Zeus, in the form of a serpent, enters the cave and rapes Persephone. Persephone becomes pregnant and gives birth to Zagreus.

It was said that while Persephone was playing with the nymph Hercyna, Hercyna held a goose against her that she let loose. The goose flew to a hollow cave and hid under a stone; when Persephone took up the stone in order to retrieve the bird, water flowed from that spot, and hence the river received the name Hercyna. This was when she was abducted by Hades according to Boeotian legend; a vase shows water birds accompany the goddesses Demeter and Hecate who are in search of the missing Persephone.

Adonis 

Adonis was an exceedingly beautiful mortal man with whom Persephone fell in love. After he was born, Aphrodite entrusted him to Persephone to raise. But when Persephone got a glimpse of the beautiful Adonis—finding him as attractive as Aphrodite did—she refused to give him back to her. The matter was brought before Zeus, and he decreed that Adonis would spend one third of the year with each goddess, and have the last third for himself. Adonis chose to spend his own portion of the year with Aphrodite. Alternatively Adonis had to spend one half of the year with each goddess, at the suggestion of the Muse Calliope. Of them Aelian wrote that Adonis' life was divided between two goddesses, one who loved him beneath the earth, and one above, while the satirical author Lucian of Samosata has Aphrodite complain to the moon goddess Selene that Eros made Persephone fall in love with her own beloved, and now she has to share Adonis with her. In another variation, Persephone met Adonis only after he had been slain by a boar; Aphrodite descended into the Underworld to take him back, but Persephone, smitten with him, would not let him go until they came to an agreement that Adonis would alternate between the land of the living and the land of the dead each year.

Wrath myths 

After a plague hit Aonia, its people asked the Oracle of Delphi, and they were told they needed to appease the anger of the king and queen of the underworld by means of sacrifice. Two maidens, Menippe and Metioche (who were the daughters of Orion), were chosen and they agreed to be offered to the two gods in order to save their country. As the two of them were led to the altar to be sacrificed, Persephone and Hades took pity on them and turned them into comets instead.

Minthe was a Naiad nymph of the river Cocytus who became mistress to Persephone's husband Hades. Persephone was not slow to notice, and in jealousy she trampled the nymph, killing her and turning her into a mint plant. Alternatively, Persephone tore Minthe to pieces for sleeping with Hades, and it was he who turned his former lover into the sweet-smelling plant. In another version, Persephone's mother Demeter kills Minthe over the insult done to her daughter.

Theophile was a girl who claimed that Hades loved her and that she was better than Persephone.

Once, Hermes chased Persphone (or Hecate) with the aim to rape her; but the goddess snored or roared in anger, frightening him off so that he desisted, hence her earning the name "Brimo" ("angry").

Favour myths 
The hero Orpheus once descended into the underworld seeking to take back to the land of the living his late wife Eurydice, who died when a snake bit her. So lovely was the music he played that it charmed Persephone and even stern Hades. So entranced was Persephone by Orpheus' sweet melody that she persuaded her husband to let the unfortunate hero take his wife back.

Sisyphus, the wily king of Corinth managed to avoid staying dead, after Death had gone to collect him, by appealing to and tricking Persephone into letting him go; thus Sisyphus returned to the light of the sun in the surface above.

When Echemeia, a queen of Kos, ceased to offer worship to Artemis, the goddess shot her with an arrow. Persephone, witnessing that, snatched the still living Euthemia and brought her to the Underworld.

When Dionysus, the god of wine, descended into the Underworld accompanied by Demeter to retrieve his dead mother Semele and bring her back to the land of the living, he is said to have offered a myrtle plant to Persephone in exchange for Semele. On a neck amphora from Athens Dionysus is depicted riding on a chariot with his mother, next to a myrtle-holding Persephone who stands with her own mother Demeter; many vases from Athens depict Dionysus in the company of Persephone and Demeter.

Socrates in Plato's Cratylus previously mentions that Hades consorts with Persephone due to her wisdom.

Worship 

Persephone was worshipped along with her mother Demeter and in the same mysteries. Her cults included agrarian magic, dancing, and rituals. The priests used special vessels and holy symbols, and the people participated with rhymes. In Eleusis there is evidence of sacred laws and other inscriptions.

The Cult of Demeter and the Maiden is found at Attica, in the main festivals Thesmophoria and Eleusinian mysteries and in a number of local cults. These festivals were almost always celebrated at the autumn sowing, and at full-moon according to the Greek tradition. In some local cults the feasts were dedicated to Demeter.

Origins

The myth of a goddess being abducted and taken to the underworld is probably Pre-Greek in origin. Samuel Noah Kramer, the renowned scholar of ancient Sumer, has posited that the Greek story of the abduction of Persephone may be derived from an ancient Sumerian story in which Ereshkigal, the ancient Sumerian goddess of the underworld, is abducted by Kur, the primeval dragon of Sumerian mythology, and forced to become ruler of the underworld against her own will.

The location of Persephone's abduction is different in each local cult. The Homeric Hymn to Demeter mentions the "plain of Nysa". The locations of this probably mythical place may simply be conventions to show that a magically distant chthonic land of myth was intended in the remote past. Demeter found and met her daughter in Eleusis, and this is the mythical disguise of what happened in the mysteries.

In his 1985 book on Greek Religion, Walter Burkert claimed that Persephone is an old chthonic deity of the agricultural communities, who received the souls of the dead into the earth, and acquired powers over the fertility of the soil, over which she reigned. The earliest depiction of a goddess Burkert claims may be identified with Persephone growing out of the ground, is on a plate from the Old-Palace period in Phaistos. According to Burkert, the figure looks like a vegetable because she has snake lines on other side of her. On either side of the vegetable person there is a dancing girl. A similar representation, where the goddess appears to come down from the sky, is depicted on the Minoan ring of Isopata.

The cults of Persephone and Demeter in the Eleusinian mysteries and in the Thesmophoria were based on old agrarian cults. The beliefs of these cults were closely-guarded secrets, kept hidden because they were believed to offer believers a better place in the afterlife than in miserable Hades. There is evidence that some practices were derived from the religious practices of the Mycenaean age. Kerenyi asserts that these religious practices were introduced from Minoan Crete. The idea of immortality which appears in the syncretistic religions of the Near East did not exist in the Eleusinian mysteries at the very beginning.

In the Near East and Minoan Crete
Walter Burkert believed that elements of the Persephone myth had origins in the Minoan religion. This belief system had unique characteristics, particularly the appearance of the goddess from above in the dance. Dance floors have been discovered in addition to "vaulted tombs", and it seems that the dance was ecstatic. Homer memorializes the dance floor which Daedalus built for Ariadne in the remote past. A gold ring from a tomb in Isopata depicts four women dancing among flowers, the goddess floating above them. An image plate from the first palace of Phaistos seems to depict the ascent of Persephone: a figure grows from the ground, with a dancing girl on each side and stylized flowers all around. The depiction of the goddess is similar to later images of "Anodos of Pherephata". On the Dresden vase, Persephone is growing out of the ground, and she is surrounded by the animal-tailed agricultural gods Silenoi.

Despoina and "Hagne" were probably euphemistic surnames of Persephone, therefore Karl Kerenyi theorizes that the cult of Persephone was the continuation of the worship of a Minoan Great goddess. It is possible that some religious practices, especially the mysteries, were transferred from a Cretan priesthood to Eleusis, where Demeter brought the poppy from Crete. Besides these similarities, Burkert explains that up to now it is not known to what extent one can and must differentiate between Minoan and Mycenean religion. In the Anthesteria Dionysos is the "divine child".

In Mycenaean Greece

There is evidence of a cult in Eleusis from the Mycenean period; however, there are not sacral finds from this period. The cult was private and there is no information about it. As well as the names of some Greek gods in the Mycenean Greek inscriptions, names of goddesses who do not have Mycenean origin appear, such as "the divine Mother" (the mother of the gods) or "the Goddess (or priestess) of the winds". In historical times, Demeter and Kore were usually referred to as "the goddesses" or "the mistresses" (Arcadia) in the mysteries . In the Mycenean Greek tablets dated 1400–1200 BC, the "two queens and the king" are mentioned. John Chadwick believes that these were the precursor divinities of Demeter, Persephone and Poseidon.

Some information can be obtained from the study of the cult of Eileithyia at Crete, and the cult of Despoina. In the cave of Amnisos at Crete, Eileithyia is related with the annual birth of the divine child and she is connected with Enesidaon (The earth shaker), who is the chthonic aspect of the god Poseidon.
Persephone was conflated with Despoina, "the mistress", a chthonic divinity in West-Arcadia. The megaron of Eleusis is quite similar to the "megaron" of Despoina at Lycosura. Demeter is united with her, the god Poseidon, and she bears him a daughter, the unnameable Despoina. Poseidon appears as a horse, as usually happens in Northern European folklore. The goddess of nature and her companion survived in the Eleusinian cult, where the words "Mighty Potnia bore a great sun" were uttered. In Eleusis, in a ritual, one child ("pais") was initiated from the hearth. The name pais (the divine child) appears in the Mycenean inscriptions.

In Greek mythology Nysa is a mythical mountain with an unknown location. Nysion (or Mysion), the place of the abduction of Persephone was also probably a mythical place which did not exist on the map, a magically distant chthonic land of myth which was intended in the remote past.

Secret rituals and festivals
 

Persephone and Demeter were intimately connected with the Thesmophoria, a widely-spread Greek festival of secret women-only rituals. These rituals, which were held in the month Pyanepsion, commemorated marriage and fertility, as well as the abduction and return of Persephone.

They were also involved in the Eleusinian mysteries, a festival celebrated at the autumn sowing in the city of Eleusis. Inscriptions refer to "the Goddesses" accompanied by the agricultural god Triptolemos (probably son of Gaia and Oceanus), and "the God and the Goddess" (Persephone and Plouton) accompanied by Eubuleus who probably led the way back from the underworld.

In Rome

The Romans first heard of her from the Aeolian and Dorian cities of Magna Graecia, who used the dialectal variant Proserpinē. Hence, in Roman mythology she was called Proserpina, a name erroneously derived by the Romans from proserpere, "to shoot forth" and as such became an emblematic figure of the Renaissance. In 205 BC, Rome officially identified Proserpina with the local Italic goddess Libera, who, along with Liber, were closely associated with the Roman grain goddess Ceres (considered equivalent to the Greek Demeter). The Roman author Gaius Julius Hyginus also considered Proserpina equivalent to the Cretan goddess Ariadne, who was the bride of Liber's Greek equivalent, Dionysus.

In Magna Graecia

At Locri, a city of Magna Graecia situated on the coast of the Ionian Sea in Calabria (a region of southern Italy), perhaps uniquely, Persephone was worshiped as protector of marriage and childbirth, a role usually assumed by Hera (in fact, Hera seems to have played no role in the public worship of the city); in the iconography of votive plaques at Locri, her abduction and marriage to Hades served as an emblem of the marital state, children at Locri were dedicated to Proserpina, and maidens about to be wed brought their peplos to be blessed. Diodorus Siculus knew the temple there as the most illustrious in Italy. During the 5th century BC, votive pinakes in terracotta were often dedicated as offerings to the goddess, made in series and painted with bright colors, animated by scenes connected to the myth of Persephone. Many of these pinakes are now on display in the National Museum of Magna Græcia in Reggio Calabria. Locrian pinakes represent one of the most significant categories of objects from Magna Graecia, both as documents of religious practice and as works of art.

For most Greeks, the marriage of Persephone was a marriage with death, and could not serve as a role for human marriage; the Locrians, not fearing death, painted her destiny in a uniquely positive light. While the return of Persephone to the world above was crucial in Panhellenic tradition, in southern Italy Persephone apparently accepted her new role as queen of the underworld, of which she held extreme power, and perhaps did not return above; Virgil for example in Georgics writes that "Proserpina cares not to follow her mother",—though it is to be noted that references to Proserpina serve as a warning, since the earth is only fertile when she is above. Although her importance stems from her marriage to Hades, in Locri she seems to have the supreme power over the land of the dead, and Hades is not mentioned in the Pelinna tablets found in the area. Many pinakes found in the cult are near Epizephyrian Locri depict the abduction of Persephone by Hades, and others show her enthroned next to her beardless, youthful husband, indicating that in Locri Persephone's abduction was taken as a model of transition from girlhood to marriage for young women; a terrifying change, but one that provides the bride with status and position in society. Those representations thus show both the terror of marriage and the triumph of the girl who transitions from bride into matroness.

It was suggested that Persephone's cult at Locri was entirely independent from that of Demeter, who supposedly was not venerated there, but a sanctuary of Demeter Thesmophoros has been found in a different region of Locri, ruling against the notion that she was completely excluded.

The temple at Locri was looted by Pyrrhus. The importance of the regionally powerful Locrian Persephone influenced the representation of the goddess in Magna Graecia. Pinakes, terracotta tablets with brightly painted sculptural scenes in relief were founded in Locri. The scenes are related to the myth and cult of Persephone and other deities. They were produced in Locri during the first half of the 5th century BC and offered as votive dedications at the Locrian sanctuary of Persephone. More than 5,000, mostly fragmentary, pinakes are stored in the National Museum of Magna Græcia in Reggio Calabria and in the museum of Locri. Representations of myth and cult on the clay tablets (pinakes) dedicated to this goddess reveal not only a 'Chthonian Queen,' but also a deity concerned with the spheres of marriage and childbirth.

The Italian archaeologist Paolo Orsi, between 1908 and 1911, carried out a meticulous series of excavations and explorations in the area which allowed him to identify the site of the renowned Persephoneion, an ancient temple dedicated to Persephone in Calabria which Diodorus in his own time knew as the most illustrious in Italy.

The place where the ruins of the Sanctuary of Persephone were brought to light is located at the foot of the Mannella hill, near the walls (upstream side) of the polis of Epizephyrian Locri.
Thanks to the finds that have been retrieved and to the studies carried on, it has been possible to date its use to a period between the 7th century BC and the 3rd century BC.

Archaeological finds suggest that worship of Demeter and Persephone was widespread in Sicily and Greek Italy.

In Orphism

Evidence from both the Orphic Hymns and the Orphic Gold Leaves demonstrate that Persephone was one of the most important deities worshiped in Orphism. In the Orphic religion, gold leaves with verses intended to help the deceased enter into an optimal afterlife were often buried with the dead. Persephone is mentioned frequently in these tablets, along with Demeter and Euklês, which may be another name for Plouton. The ideal afterlife destination believers strive for is described on some leaves as the "sacred meadows and groves of Persephone". Other gold leaves describe Persephone's role in receiving and sheltering the dead, in such lines as "I dived under the kolpos [portion of a Peplos folded over the belt] of the Lady, the Chthonian Queen", an image evocative of a child hiding under its mother's apron.

In Orphism, Persephone is believed to be the mother of the first Dionysus. In Orphic myth, Zeus came to Persephone in her bedchamber in the underworld and impregnated her with the child who would become his successor. The infant Dionysus was later dismembered by the Titans, before being reborn as the second Dionysus, who wandered the earth spreading his mystery cult before ascending to the heavens with his second mother, Semele. The first, "Orphic" Dionysus is sometimes referred to with the alternate name Zagreus. The earliest mentions of this name in literature describe him as a partner of Gaia and call him the highest god. The Greek poet Aeschylus considered Zagreus either an alternate name for Hades, or his son (presumably born to Persephone). Scholar Timothy Gantz noted that Hades was often considered an alternate, cthonic form of Zeus, and suggested that it is likely Zagreus was originally the son of Hades and Persephone, who was later merged with the Orphic Dionysus, the son of Zeus and Persephone, owing to the identification of the two fathers as the same being. However, no known Orphic sources use the name "Zagreus" to refer to Dionysus. It is possible that the association between the two was known by the 3rd century BC, when the poet Callimachus may have written about it in a now-lost source. In Orphic myth, the Eumenides are attributed as daughters of Persephone and Zeus. Whereas Melinoë was conceived as the result of rape when Zeus disguised himself as Hades in order to mate with Persephone, the Eumenides' origin is unclear.

Other local cults

There were local cults of Demeter and Kore in Greece, Asia Minor, Sicily, Magna Graecia, and Libya.
 Attica
 Athens, in the mysteries of Agrae. This was a local cult near the river Ilissos. They were celebrated during spring in the month Anthesterion. Later they became an obligation for the participants of the "greater" Eleusinian mysteries. There was a temple of Demeter and Kore and an image of Triptolemos.
 Piraeus: The Skirophoria, a festival related to the Thesmophoria.
 Megara: Cult of Demeter thesmophoros and Kore. The city was named after its megara .
 Aegina: Cult of Demeter thesmophoros and Kore.
 Phlya: near Koropi. The local mystery religion may have been originally dedicated to Demeter, Kore, and Zeus Ktesios; Pausanias mentions a temple to all three there. It seems that the mysteries were related to the mysteries of Andania in Messene.
 Boeotia
 Thebes: purportedly granted to her by Zeus in return for a favor. As well, the cults of Demeter and Kore in a feast named Thesmophoria but probably different. It was celebrated in the summer month Bukatios.
 A feast in Boeotia, in the month Demetrios (Pyanepsion), probably similar with the Thesmophoria.
 Peloponnese (except Arcadia)
 Hermione: An old cult of Demeter Chthonia, Kore, and Klymenos (Hades). Cows were pushed into the temple, and then they were killed by four women. It is possible that Hermione was a mythical name, the place of the souls.
 Asine: Cult of Demeter Chthonia. The cult seems to be related to the original cult of Demeter in Hermione.
 Lakonia: Temple of Demeter Eleusinia near Taygetos. The feast was named Eleuhinia, and the name was given before the relation of Demeter with the cult of Eleusis.
 Lakonia at Aigila: Dedicated to Demeter. Men were excluded.
 near Sparta: Cult of Demeter and Kore, the Demeters (Δαμάτερες, "Damaters"). According to Hesychius, the feast lasted three days (Thesmophoria).
 Corinth: Cult of Demeter, Kore, and Pluton.
 Triphylia in Elis: Cult of Demeter, Kore, and Hades.
 Arcadia
Pheneos : Mysteries of Demeter Thesmia and Demeter Eleusinia. The Eleusinian cult was introduced later.
 Pallantion near Tripoli: Cult of Demeter and Kore.
 Karyai: Cult of Kore and Pluton.
 Tegea: Cult of Demeter and Kore, the Karpophoroi, "Fruit givers".
 Megalopolis: Cult of the Great goddesses, Demeter and Kore Sotira, "the savior".
 Mantineia: Cult of Demeter and Kore in the fest Koragia.
 Trapezus: Mysteries of the Great goddesses, Demeter and Kore. The temple was built near a spring, and a fire was burning out of the earth.
 Islands
 Paros: Cult of Demeter, Kore, and Zeus-Eubuleus.
 Amorgos: Cult of Demeter, Kore, and Zeus-Eubuleus.
 Delos: Cult of Demeter, Kore, and Zeus-Eubuleus. Probably a different feast with the name Thesmophoria, celebrated in a summer month (the same month in Thebes). Two big loaves of bread were offered to the two goddesses. Another feast was named Megalartia.
 Mykonos: Cult of Demeter, Kore, and Zeus-Buleus.
 Crete : Cult of Demeter and Kore, in the month Thesmophorios.
 Rhodes: Cult of Demeter and Kore, in the month Thesmophorios. The two goddesses are the Damaters in an inscription from Lindos
 Egypt
 Alexandria: According to Epiphanius, a temple of Kore existed in Alexandria. He describes a celebration of the birth of Aion from Kore the Virgin which took place there on 6 January. Aion may be a form of Dionysus, reborn annually; an inscription from Eleusis also identifies Aion as a son of Kore.
 Asia Minor
 Knidos: Cult of Demeter, Kore, and Pluton. Agrarian magic similar to the one used in Thesmophoria and in the cult of the potniai (Cabeirian).
 Ephesos : Cult of Demeter and Kore, celebrated at night-time.
 Priene: Cult of Demeter and Kore, similar to the Thesmophoria.
 Sicily
 Syracuse: There was a harvest festival of Demeter and Persephone at Syracuse when the grain was ripe (about May).
 A fest Koris katagogi, the descent of Persephone into the underworld.
 Libya
 Cyrene: Temple of Demeter and Kore

Modern reception

Persephone also appears many times in popular culture. Featured in a variety of novels such as Persephone   by Kaitlin Bevis,  A Touch of Darkness  by Scarlett St. Clair, Persephone's Orchard by Molly Ringle, The Goddess Test by Aimee Carter, The Goddess Letters by Carol Orlock, Abandon by Meg Cabot, and Lore Olympus by Rachel Smythe, her story has also been treated by Suzanne Banay Santo in Persephone Under the Earth in the light of women's spirituality. Here Santo treats the mythic elements in terms of maternal sacrifice to the burgeoning sexuality of an adolescent daughter. Accompanied by the classic, sensual paintings of Fredric Lord Leighton and William-Adolphe Bouguereau, Santo portrays Persephone not as a victim but as a woman in quest of sexual depth and power, transcending the role of daughter, though ultimately returning to it as an awakened Queen.

See also

 Anthesphoria, festival honoring Proserpina, and Persephone
 Eleusinian Mysteries
 Rape of Persephone
 Sporus

Notes

References

Bibliography 

 
 Theognis; Edmonds, J.M. (1931) [in] Elegy and Iambu with an English Translation by J.M. Edmonds. Cambridge, MA. Harvard University Press. London. William Heinemann Ltd. 1. Online version at the Perseus Digital Library .
 Ovid (n/d) Metamorphoses 10.728–731 
 Strabo (1924) The Geography of Strabo. Edition by H.L. Jones. Cambridge, MA: Harvard University Press; London: William Heinemann, Ltd. Online version at the Perseus Digital Library. 
 Diodorus Siculus (1888-1890) Bibliotheca Historica. vols 1–2. Immanel Bekker; Ludwig Dindorf; Friedrich Vogel [eds]. Leipzig: aedibus B.G. Teubneri. Greek text available at the Perseus Digital Library .
 Antoninus Liberalis; Celoria, F. (1992) The Metamorphoses of Antoninus Liberalis translated by Francis Celoria. Routledge. Online version at the Topos Text Project. 
 Athanassakis, Apostolos N.; Wolkow, Benjamin M. (29 May 2013) The Orphic Hymns, Johns Hopkins University Press; owlerirst Printing edition. . Google Books .
 Bell, Robert E., Women of Classical Mythology: A Biographical Dictionary, ABC-CLIO 1991, . Internet Archive.
 Oppian, Colluthus, Tryphiodorus (1928) "Halieutica" [in] Oppian, Colluthus, and Tryphiodorus, translated by A.W. Mair. Loeb Classical Library 219. Cambridge, MA: Harvard University Press. Online version at Topos text. 
 Apollodorus; Frazer, J. (1921) Apollodorus, The Library, with an English Translation by Sir James George Frazer, F.B.A., F.R.S. in 2 Volumes. Cambridge, MA: Harvard University Press; London, UK: William Heinemann Ltd. Online version at the Perseus Digital Library .
 Bowra, M. (1957) The Greek Experience. The World Publishing Company, Cleveland and New York.
 Burkert Walter (1985). Greek Religion. Harvard University Press . 
 Farnell, Lewis Richard (1906) The Cults of the Greek States, volume 3 (chapters on: Demeter and Kore-Persephone; Cult-monuments of Demeter-Kore; Ideal types of Demeter-Kore).
 Gantz, T. (1996) Early Greek Myth: A guide to literary and artistic sources. Johns Hopkins University Press, in two volumes:  (Vol. 1),  (Vol. 2).
 Grimal, Pierre, The Dictionary of Classical Mythology, Wiley-Blackwell, 1996, .
 Hard, Robin (2004) The Routledge Handbook of Greek Mythology: Based on H.J. Rose's "Handbook of Greek Mythology", Psychology Press, ISBN 978-0-415-18636-0.
 Heslin, Peter (2018) Propertius, Greek Myth, and Virgil: Rivalry, allegory, and polemic, Oxford, Oxford University Press. . Google Books .
 Homer; Murray, A.T. (1924) The Iliad with an English Translation by A.T. Murray, PhD in two volumes, Cambridge, MA., Harvard University Press; London, William Heinemann, Ltd.
 Homer; Murray, A.T. (1919) The Odyssey with an English Translation by A.T. Murray, PH.D. in two volumes. Cambridge, MA., Harvard University Press; London, William Heinemann, Ltd.
 Evelyn-White, H.G. (1914) Homeric Hymn to Demeter (2), in The Homeric Hymns and Homerica with an English Translation by Hugh G. Evelyn-White, Cambridge, MA: Harvard University Press; London, UK: William Heinemann Ltd. Online version at the Perseus Digital Library .
 Janda, Michael (2010) Die Musik nach dem Chaos. Innsbruck
 
 Kerenyi, K. (1967) Eleusis: Archetypal image of mother and daughter . Princeton University Press.
 Kerenyi, K. (1976) Dionysos: Archetypal Image of Indestructible Life, Princeton: Bollingen. Google Books .
 Kern, O. (1922) Orphicorum Fragmenta, Berlin. Internet Archive.
 Nilsson Martin (1967) Die Geschichte der Griechischen Religion, vol I. Revised ed. Muenchen, DE: C.F Beck Verlag.
 Nilsson, M. (1950) Minoan-Mycenaean Religion, and its Survival in Greek Religion, Revised 2nd ed. Lund: Gleerup.
 Meisner, Dwayne A. (2018) Orphic Tradition and the Birth of the Gods, Oxford University Press. .
 Pausanias; Jones, W.H.S.; Ormerod, H.A. (1918) Pausanias Description of Greece with an English Translation by W.H.S. Jones, Litt.D., and H.A. Ormerod, M.A., in 4 volumes, Cambridge, MA, Harvard University Press; London: William Heinemann Ltd.
 
 Lucian; Fowler, H.W.; Fowler, F.G. (1905) Dialogues of the Gods; translated by Fowler, H.W. and F.G. Oxford: The Clarendon Press.
 Gaius Julius Hyginus; Grant, Mary (n/d?) Astronomica from the Myths of Hyginus translated and edited by Mary Grant. University of Kansas Publications in Humanistic Studies. Online version at the Topos Text Project .
 Miles, Gary B. (1980), Virgil's Georgics: A New Interpretation, University of California Press, . Google books .
 Aelian; Scholfield, A.F. (1959) On Animals, volume III: books 12–17, translated by A.F. Scholfield, Loeb Classical Library No. 449, Cambridge, MA: Harvard University Press. Online version  at Harvard University Press. .
 Paton, W.R. (1916) The Greek Anthology with an English Translation. London: William Heinemann Ltd. 1. Online version at the Topos Text Project .
 
 
 Rohde, E. (1961) Psyche. Seelenkult und Unsterblichkeitsglaube der Griechen. Wissenschaftliche Buchgesellshaft. Darmstad. (First edition 1893): full text in German downloadable as pdf.
 Rohde, E. (2000), Psyche: The Cult of Souls and the Belief in Immortality among the Greeks, trans. from the 8th edn. by W. B. Hillis (London: Routledge & Kegan Paul, 1925; reprinted by Routledge, 2000), online
 Schachermeyr, F. (1964), Die Minoische Kultur des alten Kreta, W.Kohlhammer Verlag Stuttgart.
 King, Stephen (2008) Duma Key
 Smith, W. (1873) Dictionary of Greek and Roman Biography and Mythology, London. "Persephone" .
 Smyth, H.W. (1926) Aeschylus, with an English translation by Herbert Weir Smyth, Volume II, London Heinemann. Internet Archive.
 Tripp, Edward, Crowell's Handbook of Classical Mythology, Thomas Y. Crowell Co; First edition (June 1970). .
 Welch, Anthony (2013) The Renaissance Epic and the Oral Past, Yale University Press. .
 West, M.L. (1983) The Orphic Poems, Clarendon Press Oxford. .
 Zuntz, G. (1973) Persephone: Three essays on religion and thought in Magna Graecia.

External links

 Martin Nilsson. The Greek popular religion
 Adams John Paul. Mycenean divinities
 PERSEPHONE from The Theoi Project
 THE RAPE OF PERSEPHONE from The Theoi Project
 PERSEPHONE from Greek Mythology Link
 The Princeton Encyclopedia of classical sites:Despoina
 DESPOINA from The Theoi Project
 Kore Photographs
 Flickr users' photos tagged with Persephone
 Proserpine (Persephone) sculpture by Hiram Powers

 
Queens in Greek mythology
Life-death-rebirth goddesses
Eleusinian Mysteries
Underworld goddesses
Greek death goddesses
Greek underworld
Greek goddesses
Divine women of Zeus
Chthonic beings
Children of Demeter
Nature goddesses
Harvest goddesses
Food goddesses
Food deities
Death goddesses
Destroyer goddesses
Children of Zeus
Marriage goddesses
Deeds of Demeter
Metamorphoses characters
Women of Hades
Fertility goddesses
Kidnapped people
Characters in the Odyssey
Rape of Persephone
Childhood goddesses
Women and death
Seasons
Spring deities